James Marshall Lawson was a lawyer and state legislator in South Dakota. He served in the South Dakota House of Representatives, including as speaker of the house, and in the South Dakota Senate.

He helped establish Northern Normal and Industrial School.

See also
List of speakers of the South Dakota House of Representatives

References

Year of birth missing
Year of death missing
Speakers of the South Dakota House of Representatives
South Dakota state senators
Members of the South Dakota House of Representatives